Leonid Viktorovich Nosyrev (born 22 January 1937, Ivanteyevka, Moscow Oblast) is a Soviet and Russian director-animator, screenwriter, artist, animator. Laureate of the Prize of the President of the Russian Federation in the field of literature and art for works for children and youth (2019). Honored Art Worker of the Russian Federation (2003). Winner of National Animation Awards (2020).

Biography 
In 1956, Nosyrev finished Fedoskino school of miniature painting. Upon further completion of the courses for animation artists at Soyuzmultfilm in 1961, he began to work at the studio. In 1975, he also graduated from the Moscow State University, specializing in the theory and history of art. 

In 1968, Nosyrev was promoted to a director at Soyuzmultfilm. He was also among the founders of Happy Merry-Go-Round film magazine. Since 1996, Nosyrev has been teaching at the Gerasimov Institute of Cinematography.

References

External links
 

Living people
1937 births
Soviet animation directors
Animation directors
Moscow State University alumni
Soviet animators
Russian animators
Russian film directors
Academic staff of the Gerasimov Institute of Cinematography